The 1956 Argentine Grand Prix was a Formula One motor race held on 22 January 1956 at Buenos Aires. It was race 1 of  8 in the 1956 World Championship of Drivers.

With the withdrawal of Mercedes from Formula One, Fangio and Moss would begin the season with new teams. Fangio would join Ferrari while Moss would lead the Maserati team. The grid at Argentina was completely composed of Italian cars. Ferrari and Maserati showed up with five cars each. The other three cars were Maseratis: two private entries and Hawthorn for the B.R.M. team.

Ferrari dominated practice and occupied the first three grid positions with Fangio's pole time 2.2 sec faster than second. However, Maserati dominated the early race with Menditeguy and Moss leading the field. Fangio was a non factor with a faulty fuel pump. He took over Musso's car on lap 29 and re-entered in fifth place. Fangio quickly passed Behra but lost his position after spinning. From laps 40-43 disaster struck the leaders. While third Castellotti's gearbox broke, Menditeguy left the lead with a broken driveshaft, and new leader Moss's engine began to smoke. Fangio, who had overtaken Behra, passed the ailing Moss on lap 66 and finished unchallenged after Behra spun late. The race was not without controversy when the Maserati team manager lodged a protest that Fangio was push-started after the earlier spin. However, the protest was rejected by both the stewards and the F.I.A.

Classification

Qualifying

Race

Notes
 – Includes 1 point for fastest lap

Shared drives
 Car #34: Luigi Musso (30 laps) and Juan Manuel Fangio (68 laps). They shared the 8 points for first place.
 Car #10: Chico Landi (46 laps) and Gerino Gerini (46 laps). They shared the 3 points for fourth place.
 Car #16: Alberto Uria (44 laps) and Oscar Gonzalez (44 laps).

Championship standings after the race 
Drivers' Championship standings

Note: Only the top five positions are included.

References

Argentine Grand Prix
Argentine Grand Prix
Argentine Grand Prix
Argentine Grand Prix